Jalarnie Seales (born 6 October 1997) is a West Indian cricketer. He made his List A debut on 6 November 2019, for Combined Campuses and Colleges in the 2019–20 Regional Super50 tournament.

References

External links
 

1997 births
Living people
Combined Campuses and Colleges cricketers
Place of birth missing (living people)